Steam Corner is a small unincorporated settlement in Millcreek Township, Fountain County, Indiana.

History
A post office was established at Steam Corner in 1851, and remained in operation until it was discontinued in 1904. Steam Mill was named from the presence of a steam-powered mill.

In the 1880s the Chicago and Great Southern Railway completed a north/south rail line through Fountain County which ran from Clay and Vigo counties in the south to Newton County and Kankakee County, Illinois in the north.  Steam Corner, also known as Long Siding Station, became a stop along this railroad between stations at Veedersburg and Yeddo.  The rail line was later operated by the Chicago and Eastern Illinois Railroad and ultimately the Chicago, Attica and Southern Railroad, which ran the line until its closure in the 1940s.

Attractions

Steam Corner is notable in its area as the site of flea markets, exhibitions and festivals.  The Steam Corner Flea Market began in 1970 as a yard sale by residents Don and Ruth Staggs and grew over many years; the site now hosts several annual events, including two antique power shows with flea markets, an Independence Day festival, and two weeks of events during Parke County's Covered Bridge Festival.

Steam Corner has a Country Kitchen restaurant and concession stands owned by the Flea Market, open during events.  Camping is also available.

Geography
Prairie Creek begins northeast of Steam Corner and flows west to Coal Creek near the Wabash River.

References

External links
  Steam Corner official website]
 Covered Bridge Festival website

Unincorporated communities in Fountain County, Indiana
Unincorporated communities in Indiana